Łany Średnie  is a village in the administrative district of Gmina Żarnowiec, within Zawiercie County, Silesian Voivodeship, in southern Poland.

The village has a population of 330.

References

Villages in Zawiercie County